Zygote Media Group is a 3D human anatomy content and technology company. Formed in 1994, with an initial emphasis on anatomically accurate 3D human models for the entertainment industry, the company has since specialized in enhanced visualization of human anatomy and life sciences.

Zygote licenses its comprehensive library of 3D human anatomy models for animation, simulation, rendered illustrations, engineering, and analysis. Zygote also provides specialized services in the development of life science-related software and content.

In collaboration with Google, Zygote created Google Body, a fully 3D interactive anatomical atlas. With the sun-setting of Google Labs, the product was re-branded ZygoteBody. Zygote continues to support ZygoteBody as a free service for medical professionals, patients, educators, students, and anatomy enthusiasts.

The new technology utilizes Zygote anatomy for finite element analysis and computer simulation. These simulations and analyses provide vital information in studying product and environmental effects on the human body. Usage includes fluid dynamics of the heart and blood vessels, bone stress under loading, vehicle safety systems, and medical product design and testing.

In 2000, the art and hobbyist division was spun off as Digital Art Zone, now DAZ Productions.

External links
 
 ZygoteBody (Web GL enabled browsers)
 3DScience.com

Anatomical simulation
Mass media companies established in 1994
Mass media companies of the United States